BDK may refer to:
Bruderschaft des Kreuzes, a professional wrestling stable in Chikara
Bukkyo Dendo Kyokai, a Japanese organization devoted to translating and disseminating Buddhist literature 
Bundu dia Kongo, a politico-religious group in Bas Kongo, Democratic Republic of the Congo
Big Daddy Kane, an American rapper.
Federation of German Detectives (Bund Deutscher Kriminalbeamter)
Quebec comics, called by some in the 1970s Bande dessinée kébécoise